Iqaluit-Tasiluk is a territorial electoral district (riding) for the Legislative Assembly of Nunavut, Canada.

The riding consists of part of what was Iqaluit East and Iqaluit Centre. The district was created prior to the 28 October 2013 general election.

Election results

2017 election

2013 election

References

External links
 Map of riding for 2017 election from Elections Nunavut

Electoral districts of Qikiqtaaluk Region
2013 establishments in Nunavut